|}

The Galway Hurdle is a National Hunt hurdle race in Ireland which is open to horses aged four years or older. It is run at Galway over a distance of about 2 miles (2 miles and 11 yards, or 3,229 metres), and during its running there are nine hurdles to be jumped. It is a handicap race, and it is scheduled to take place each year in late July or early August.

The event is held during the seven-day Galway Festival meeting. It was established in 1913, and the inaugural running was won by Red Damsel. For the first six years it was contested over 1½ miles. The race is now sponsored by Guinness.

Records
Most successful horse since 1988 (2 wins):
 Tudor City (2019,2022) 

Leading jockey since 1988 (3 wins):
 Patrick Mullins - Sharjah (2018), Aramon (2020), Saldier (2021)

Leading trainer since 1988 (5 wins):
 Willie Mullins – Mystical City (1996), Clondaw Warrior (2016), Sharjah (2018), Aramon (2020), Saldier (2021)

Winners since 1988
 Weights given in stones and pounds

Earlier winners

 1913 – Red Damsel
 1950 – Lady's Find
 1951 – Wye Fly
 1952 – Warrenscourt Lad
 1953 – Prince of Devon
 1954 – Cloudless Days
 1955 – Antigue II
 1956 – Ivy Green
 1957 – Tymon Castle
 1958 – Knight Errant
 1959 – Cashel View
 1960 – Commutering
 1961 – Cynge Noir / Newgrove *
 1962 – Tripacer
 1963 – Snow Trix
 1964 – Extra Stout
 1965 – Ticonderoga
 1966 – Warkey
 1967 – Muir
 1968 – Annalong
 1969 – Bonne
 1970 – Dictora
 1971 – Highway View
 1972 – Hardboy
 1973 – Lesabelle
 1974 – Just for Fun
 1975 – Double Default / Spanner *
 1976 – Negrada
 1977 – Paddy Bouler
 1978 – Prince Tammy
 1979 – Hard Tarquin
 1980 – Pearlstone
 1981 – Double Wrapped
 1982 – Pinch Hitter
 1983 – Pinch Hitter
 1984 – Tara Lee
 1985 – Strathline
 1986 – Rushmoor
 1987 – Belsir

* The 1961 race was a dead-heat and has joint winners.* There were two winners in 1975 as the race was split into separate divisions.

See also
 Horse racing in Ireland
 List of Irish National Hunt races

References
 Racing Post:
 carlow-nationalist.ie – "All set for another Ballybrit Bonanza" (2006).
 galway-races.net – "History of the Galway Festival".
 timesonline.co.uk – "Glorious Galway" (2006).

National Hunt races in Ireland
National Hunt hurdle races
Recurring events established in 1913
1913 establishments in Ireland
Ballybrit Racecourse